Eccellenza Calabria is the regional Eccellenza football division for clubs in the Southern Italian region of Calabria, Italy. It is competed among 16 teams, in one group. The winners of the Groups are promoted to Serie D. The club who finishes second also have the chance to gain promotion, they are entered into a national play-off which consists of two rounds.

Champions
Here are the past champions of the Calabria Eccellenza, organised into their respective seasons.

1991–92 La Sportiva Cariatese  	   	 	
1992–93 Reggio Gallina 	  		
1993–94 Gioiese
1994–95 Crotone  		
1995–96 Cirò Krimisa 	  		
1996–97 Rende   		  		
1997–98 Nuova Vibonese 	  		
1998–99 Juventus Siderno 
1999–2000 Nuova Acri	  		
2000–01 Rossanese	
2001–02 Rosarnese	  		
2002–03 Rende   		
2003–04 Nuova Rossanese	 		
2004–05 Villese
2005–06 Paolana  		
2006–07 Rosarno
2007–08 HinterReggio
2008–09 Sambiase
2009–10 Omega Bagaladi
2010–11 Acri
2011–12 Montalto Uffugo
2012–13 Gioiese
2013–14 Roccella
2014–15 Palmese
2015–16 Sersale
2016–17 Isola Capo Rizzuto
2017–18 Locri
2018–19 Corigliano
2019–20 San Luca
2020–21 Sambiase
2021–22 Locri

References

External links
Comitato Regionale Calabria
Some Club Histories In the League

Sport in Calabria
Cal
Sports leagues established in 1991
1991 establishments in Italy
Football clubs in Italy
Association football clubs established in 1991